Sinomastodon ("Chinese mastodont") is an extinct gomphothere genus (of order Proboscidea), from the Late Miocene to Early Pleistocene deposits of Asia (China, Japan, Thailand, Myanmar, Kashmir, and Indonesia)

The animal was very similar to modern elephants with sizes ranging from 3.6 to 5.3 m. Several species are known from China, the best-known being S. hanjiangensis from the Late Miocene and Early Pliocene of the Shanxi province. It is known from an incomplete skeleton of an adult (measuring 5.3 m) including maxilla, mandibles, teeth, tusks and other materials that have been discovered. The Japanese species S. sendaicus described in 1924 from dentary materials from Pliocene deposits has been ascribed to the genus, as well as the species S. bumiajuensis (formerly Tetralophodon) from the late Pliocene of Java.

Taxonomy
The taxonomic position of Sinomastodon is disputed. Some authors suggest that Sinomastodon originated from North American gomphotheres that migrated into Asia. Position acccording to Mothé et al. 2016 supporting this hypothesis, showing Sinomastodon nested amongst North American gomphotheres:

However, the teeth of the earliest Sinomastodon species from the Late Miocene are zygodont, a morphology unknown in North American gomphotheres. Therefore is it is alternatively suggested that it derived from an Asian species of Gomphotherium, such as G. subtapiroideum or G. wimani.

Diet

The diet of Sinomastodon was probably that of a browser, similar to another proboscidean which it shared its environment with, Stegodon.

References 

 Tobien, H., Chen, G.F., and Li, Y.Q., 1986; Mastodons (Proboscidea, Mammalia) from the LateNeogene and Early Pleistocene of the People's Republic of China. Part I, HistoricalAccount. Mainzer geowiss, mitt., 15, pp. 119–181.

External links

Gomphotheres
Miocene proboscideans
Pliocene proboscideans
Pleistocene proboscideans
Cenozoic mammals of Asia
Prehistoric placental genera
Fossil taxa described in 1986